Ēriks Vanags (20 January 1893 in Riga) was a Latvian track and field athlete who competed for the Russian Empire in the 1912 Summer Olympics. In 1912 he finished 20th in the shot put competition and 39th in the discus throw event.

References

External links
list of Latvian athletes

1893 births
Year of death missing
Latvian male shot putters
Male shot putters from the Russian Empire
Olympic competitors for the Russian Empire
Athletes (track and field) at the 1912 Summer Olympics
Athletes from Riga